Joe's Hap'nin's is an album by trumpeter Joe Newman featuring tracks recorded in 1961 and originally released on the Swingville label.

Reception

AllMusic awarded the album 3 stars.

Track listing
All compositions by Joe Newman except as indicated
 "Oh Gee" (Matthew Gee) - 4:11
 "Dacquiri" - 5:00
 "The Very Thought of You" (Ray Noble) - 6:38
 "Strike up the Band" (George Gershwin, Ira Gershwin) - 3:01
 "Blues for Slim" - 6:40
 "For You" (Johnny Burke, Al Dubin) - 8:11
 "The Continental" (Con Conrad, Herb Magidson) - 3:20

Personnel 
Joe Newman - trumpet
Tommy Flanagan - piano
Wendell Marshall - bass
Billy English - drums

References 

1961 albums
Joe Newman (trumpeter) albums
Swingville Records albums
Albums produced by Esmond Edwards
Albums recorded at Van Gelder Studio